Just a Love Song... Christian Bautista Live! is the first live album by Filipino singer Christian Bautista, released on January 24, 2007 in the Philippines by Warner Music Philippines. The album is composed of nineteen cover versions of songs from the 1970s up to the 1990s. It was recorded overnight at Teatrino, Greenhills, backed by basic rhythm section, a grand piano and a string section, while being watched by an audience composing of  specially invited fans. It was released both in the Philippines and Indonesia on CD and DVD formats. To date, the album has been certified platinum by the Philippine Association of the Record Industry.

A "Special Christmas Edition" of the album was released in October 2007, with a new track list. Five additional Christmas songs were included plus the standard edition of the album.

Background
Initially, Bautista refused to create a whole revival album, saying "I (Bautista) didn’t want to seem to be jumping on the bandwagon [...] it was time for me to offer something new at this point (for his fans)".

A brainstorming session was then made between him, his managers and his record label, after which the final list of tracks for the album was made.

Reception
Commercially, Just a Love Song... Christian Bautista Live! is the weakest-selling album by Bautista, though it still managed to reach platinum status by the PARI. On March 11, 2007, the album was given a gold record award on ASAP '07 for selling more than 15,000 units in the Philippines.

Critically, the album received favorable reviews. Resty Odon of Titik Pilipino gave the album four out of five stars, stating "In this live recording, he works on romantic tunes and tries earnestly to tug at the memory's heartstrings". However, he disliked the fourth song, "Beautiful in My Eyes", and thought it was out of Bautista's upper register range. The review ended up with Odon, saying " All in all, though, this is a memorable recording for this artist and especially his fans.

Track listing
All tracks were produced by Neil C. Gregorio.

Personnel
Credits were taken from Titik Pilipino.

Production
 Jesy Alto - hair and make-up
 Jim Baluyut - executive producer, A&R administration
 Christian Bautista - additional song line-up
 Lachmi Baviera - additional song line-up
 Rey Cortez - album cover concept and layout
 Flerry De Leon - additional song line-up
 Dunkin' Donuts - food and drinks
 Gian Espiritu (of Essensuals) - grooming
 Audie Gemora - additional song line-up
 Neil C. Gregorio - album producer, A&R administration, mastering and sequencing
 Greenwich - food and drinks
 Mark Laccay - live recording
 Carlo Orosa - additional song line-up, creative consultant
 Steve Pagsanjan (of The Make up Studio) - hair and make-up
 Anne Poblador - additional song line-up
 Daniel Tan - photography
 Dante Tanedo - mixing
 Christopher Buenviaje - Additional Recording Engineer
 Ymaha - concert grand piano
 Frey Zambrano - additional song line-up, production coordinator

Musicians
 Pam Arrieta - cello
 Dexter Ayala - electric/fretless Bbass, back-up vocals
 Christian Bautista - lead vocals
 Hanche Bobis - grand piano
 Criss Buenviaje - acoustic/electric guitars, back-up vocals
 Marianne Ciervo - violin
 Leo Espocia - drums, back-up vocals
 Renee Francesca - violin
 Aldwin Perez - violin
 Mary Ann Policarpio - viola
 Rico Sobrevinas - saxophone, flute, back-up vocals

Recording locations
 Teatrino (Greenhills, Manila, Philippines) - live recording
 Chili Red Studio - mastering and sequencing

Certifications

References

2006 live albums
Christian Bautista albums
Covers albums